Shia Islam in Bahrain is estimated to be approximately 70% of the Muslim population in Bahrain. This number is disputed, with the Sunni royal family placing it closer to half, some surveys estimating it to be 62%, and most sources placing the estimate somewhere near 70% of the Muslim population. This number may no longer be accurate due to the increasing rates of naturalization of Sunni migrants in Bahrain. Most major mosques in the country are Shia, however, the ruling family practices Sunni Islam. According to the Washington Institute, the views of Shia and Sunni leaders in Bahrain are similar to their Arab neighboring countries.

Population

Although more than half of Bahrain's population consists of Shia Muslims (estimated at over 75 percent), the Sunni royal family, Al Khalifa, governs the country.

History

The Sunni al-Khalifa family arrived in Shia Bahrain from Najd in 1783. Their rule has been oppressive and tyrannical for the native Shia majority. The people of Bahrain celebrated the victory of the Shiite Iranian Revolution and formed gatherings to support it. In 1979, they wanted to participate in determining their own destiny through protests against the Al Khalifa government.
 Al Wefaq, as part of the Shia society in Bahrain, follows two goals: opposition to the current government in Bahrain and change the structure of society to based on rule of the people. Established in 2001, it was founded by more than 100 Shia scholars such as Ali Salman, Saeid Shahabi, Abdul Amir al-Jamri and Sheikh Isa Ahmed Qassim, leader of Al Wefaq.

February 14 Youth Coalition

According to behavior of Al-Khalifa's government, Shia activists prompted on February 14, 2011. They named that day as the Day of Rage and asked the people to protest against al-Khalifa's behavior at that day. The Al-Khalifa came into contact with the protesters and from that day widespread wave of Al-Khalifa's actions against Shiites has been performed, including the detention of women and men and children and their torture, the destruction of Shia mosques and cemeteries.

Society

There are various sects in Bahrain, such as Bahrani, Arab, Howala, Ajmi, Asians. On the other hand, dominant political and official system in Bahrain are governed by Sunni people.

According to the reports of The Guardian, when Āl Khalīfah family have begun to govern Bahrain, Shiites who have pieces of land, were changed to peasants. Now, High-ranking official positions belong to Sunnis and only few positions are ruled by Shiites. It is necessary to mention that in Bahrain Sunni is not synonymous with rich, nor Shia with poor, but on the whole the Shia majority faces worse economic circumstances.

Shia scholars

Bahrain has an ancient and historic background which arise from the presence of Shiite scholars. Some of them are listed as following:

Maitham Al Bahrani, Kamal al-Deen Maitham bin Ali bin Maitham al-Bahrani, commonly known as Sheikh Maitham Al Bahrani was a leading 13th Century Twelver Eastern Arabian theologian, author, and philosopher. Al Bahrani wrote on Twelver doctrine, affirmed free will, the infallibility of prophets and imams, the appointed imamate of `Ali, and the occultation of the Twelfth Imam. Yusuf al-Bahrani Yusuf ibn Ahmed al-Bahrani (1695–1772) (Arabic: يوسف البحراني) was a Bahraini theologian and a dominant person in the intellectual development of Twelver Shia Islam. Isa Qassim Ayatollah Sheikh Isa Ahmed Qassim (Arabic: آية الله الشيخ عيسى أحمد قاسم) is Bahrain's leading Shia cleric and a politician. He is the spiritual leader of Al Wefaq, Bahrain's biggest opposition society. He was the leader and the founders of Islamic Enlightenment institution.

See also
 Beit Al Qur'an
 Muharram in Bahrain
 Rashid Al Marikhi

References

 
Shia Islam by country